The Game of Chess is a book about chess written by Siegbert Tarrasch. It was published in 1987 by Courier Dover Publications, originally it was released in German as Das Schachspiel in 1931. In the foreword Tarrasch wrote: "Chess, like music, like love, has the power to make men happy." The book is divided in three parts the endgame, the  middlegame and the opening. It was his last book and his most successful. It has 423 pages and its ISBN number is 048625447X.

1987 non-fiction books
Chess books